Roger H. Wilson (born February 24, 1937) is an American politician in the state of Florida.

Wilson was born in New York and came to Florida in 1959. He attended Florida State University and works in the insurance business. He served in the Florida House of Representatives from 1968 to 1976 for districts 48 and 60. He is a member of the Republican Party.

References

Living people
1937 births
Republican Party members of the Florida House of Representatives